Elp is a small village in the Dutch province of Drenthe. It is a part of the municipality of Midden-Drenthe, and lies about 15 km south of Assen.

The village was first mentioned in 1362 as "in Elpe". The etymology is unclear.

Elp was home to 243 people in 1840.

The Elp culture was named after the village.

See also 
 Elp culture

References

Midden-Drenthe
Populated places in Drenthe